Processus palatinus may refer to:

 Palatine process of maxilla, also known by the Latin term processus palatinus ossis maxillae
 Primary palate, also known by the Latin term processus palatinus medianus